The Starks Building is a landmark 14-story building on Fourth Street and Muhammad Ali Boulevard in Downtown Louisville, Kentucky, USA. It was built in 1913 on a site that had been the First Christian Church of Louisville. It was commissioned by local businessman John Starks Rodes and designed by the Daniel Burnham firm of Chicago.

The Starks Building was added to the National Register of Historic Places in 1985. 

It was built in the Chicago School of architecture with Beaux Arts details. Cream-colored bricks are one of its signature features. It is decorated with classical motifs, including acanthus leaves, lion's heads and urns. It was originally a "U" shaped structure, but a 1926 addition designed by the firm Graham, Anderson, Probst & White added a new wing to create a rectangular shape with a central sunlight well. At the bottom of the central atrium was a courtyard, and until 1984 it was covered with a Plexiglas skylight.

In 1953, the building was renovated to add a parking garage - the first in the city - to the building. The 700+ space garage was built on an adjoining lot and fronts Third Street. The Starks Building is mixed use, with retail, dining and office space. In the 1990s and 2000s the owners had trouble finding tenants, with over half of the space vacant in 2006.

Notable long-time tenants include the Colonnade Cafeteria, Seng Jewelers and Rodes Men's and Women's Clothing. Current tenants include the Business First of Louisville news publication, FoodCare, a startup that relocated its headquarters to Louisville from San Francisco in April 2012, and Mediaura, a highly successful digital agency.  Colonnade Cafeteria moved into the Starks Building basement in 1926 and remained until 2006. Rodes Clothing, founded by the building's financier John Starks Rodes himself, was located in the building from 1914 until the company relocated to the suburbs in 2004.

It was owned by the Starks family until the mid-1980s when it was sold to an investment group, which resold the building in 1997 to Empire State Collateral. Empire State defaulted on the mortgage and ownership was taken over by Allstate in 2004. It was listed as the 11th largest office complex in Louisville in 2004 by the newspaper Business First.

The building was sold again in 2006 to the Hertz Investment Group. Since the purchase in 2006, occupancy has risen to 71 percent, as of May 2010, Hertz Investment Group said. The Starks building signed a number of new tenants during 2009, including an  Eddie Merlot's restaurant, part of a Fort Wayne, Ind.-based upscale steakhouse chain. With Eddie Merlot's, all the Starks street-level space has been leased.

It is connected by a skyway to Fourth Street Live!, an entertainment mall adjacent on the North side. On July 2, 2007, the Cordish Company, developers of Fourth Street Live!, announced that it would expand the mall southward by leasing the first floor (street-level) of the Starks Building. The Baltimore-based developer has since abandoned plans to develop  of vacant street-level space in the Starks Building.

References

External links

Starks Building adding high-floor apartments in historic office building -- May 2010
Starks building page with floorplans and photos
Starks Directory - lists tenants within the building

Commercial buildings on the National Register of Historic Places in Kentucky
Chicago school architecture in Kentucky
Office buildings completed in 1913
Skyscraper office buildings in Louisville, Kentucky
1913 establishments in Kentucky
National Register of Historic Places in Louisville, Kentucky
Office buildings on the National Register of Historic Places